Henry Herbert Lartey is a Ghanaian accountant, entrepreneur and politician. He was the candidate of the Great Consolidated Popular Party for the Ghanaian presidential election in December 2012. He replaced his father Daniel Augustus Lartey as the leader of the party and was chosen to contest the 7 December 2012 election. He netted 38,223 votes out of the 10,995,262 valid votes cast.

References

External links and sources 
GCPP Official website

1954 births
Living people
Great Consolidated Popular Party politicians
Candidates for President of Ghana
People from Accra